The 2019 Tennessee State Tigers football team represented Tennessee State University as a member of the Ohio Valley Conference (OVC) in the 2019 NCAA Division I FCS football season. They were led by tenth-year head coach Rod Reed and played their home games at Nissan Stadium and Hale Stadium. Tennessee State finished the season 3–9 overall and 2–6 in OVC play to tie for seventh place.

Previous season

The Tigers finished the 2018 season 4–5, 3–4 in OVC play to finish in fifth place.

Preseason

Preseason coaches' poll
The OVC released their preseason coaches' poll on July 22, 2019. The Tigers were picked to finish in fifth place.

Preseason All-OVC team
The Tigers had four players selected to the preseason all-OVC team.

Offense

Chris Rowland – WR

Thomas Burton – C

Raekwon Allen – OG

Defense

Dajour Nesbeth – DB

Headlines
On August 20, 2019, it was announced that starting quarterback Demry Croft had been charged with six counts of felony rape and two counts of sexual battery, from an incident that took place on December 1, 2018.

Schedule

Game summaries

Mississippi Valley State

at Middle Tennessee

vs. Jackson State

Arkansas–Pine Bluff

at Eastern Kentucky

at Jacksonville State

Murray State

Austin Peay

Southeast Missouri State

Eastern Illinois

at UT Martin

at Tennessee Tech

Players drafted into the NFL

References

Tennessee State
Tennessee State Tigers football seasons
Tennessee State Tigers football